Gerald Charles Lowrey (February 14, 1905 – October 20, 1979) was a Canadian ice hockey forward who played six seasons in the National Hockey League for the Toronto Maple Leafs, Pittsburgh Pirates, Philadelphia Quakers, Chicago Black Hawks and Ottawa Senators between 1927 and 1933. The rest of his career, which lasted from 1926 to 1937, was spent in various minor leagues. Born in Ottawa, Ontario, Lowrey's brothers Eddie and Fred Lowrey also played in the NHL. Three other brothers – Tom, Frank and Bill – played with lower level teams in the Ottawa City Hockey League.

Career statistics

Regular season and playoffs

External links

1905 births
1979 deaths
Canadian ice hockey left wingers
Chicago Blackhawks players
London Panthers players
Ontario Hockey Association Senior A League (1890–1979) players
Ottawa Senators (1917) players
Philadelphia Quakers (NHL) players
Pittsburgh Pirates (NHL) players
Providence Reds players
Quebec Castors players
Ice hockey people from Ottawa
Toronto Falcons (CPHL) players
Toronto Maple Leafs players